Pagoo is an illustrated children's book by Holling C. Holling that was published in 1957.

The book tells the story of a hermit crab who is guided by instinct presented in the form of a voice called "Old Pal". In the process it presents a study of tide pool life. 

Like most of Holling's works, it is lushly illustrated, containing many full-page color paintings. Pages with text in them are also generously illustrated, with black-and-white pen-and-ink drawings in the margins, many with explanatory captions. It was the last of two dozen books that Holling published over a three-decade career.

References

1957 American novels
Fictional crabs